Gnathophis heterolinea is an eel in the family Congridae (conger/garden eels). It was described by Adolf Kotthaus in 1968, originally under the genus Lemkea. It is a tropical, marine eel which is known from Mombasa, Kenya, in the western Indian Ocean. It dwells at a depth range of 177–243 metres.

References

heterolinea
Taxa named by Adolf Kotthaus
Fish described in 1968